The 2006 Big 12 Conference baseball tournament was held at AT&T Bricktown Ballpark in Oklahoma City, OK from May 24 through 28.  Kansas won their first tournament and earned the Big 12 Conference's automatic bid to the 2006 NCAA Division I baseball tournament. This was the first year that the tournament adopted a round-robin format, with the winners of two 4-team pools facing off in a championship game.

Regular Season Standings
Source:

Colorado and Iowa State did not sponsor baseball teams.

Tournament

Kansas State and Texas A&M did not make the tournament.

All-Tournament team

See also
College World Series
NCAA Division I Baseball Championship
Big 12 Conference baseball tournament

References

Big 12 Tourney media guide 
Big 12 2006 Leaders

Tournament
Big 12 Conference Baseball Tournament
Big 12 Conference baseball tournament
Big 12 Conference baseball tournament
Baseball competitions in Oklahoma City
College sports tournaments in Oklahoma